Norsk is a rural locality (a selo) in Selemdzhinsky District of Amur Oblast, Russia.

Geography

Climate
Norsk has a monsoon-influenced humid continental climate (Köppen climate classification Dwb), with dry, bitterly cold winters and warm, wet summers.

References

Rural localities in Selemdzhinsky District